Andy Jorman Polo Andrade (born 29 September 1994), commonly known as La Joya (The Jewel), is a Peruvian professional footballer who plays as a winger for Universitario and the Peru national team. Polo made his professional debut with Peruvian club Universitario in the 2011 season at the young age of 16. Polo built a name for himself with his rapid acceleration and scoring skills. Being able to play in any of the four attacking positions, in his first season he quickly became an asset in the attacking force of his team. As the team's top scorer, Polo helped the Universitario under-20 squad win the 2011 U-20 Copa Libertadores.

Club career

Universitario
Polo got his start in Universitario de Deportes as a youth. He made his official debut in the Torneo Descentralizado on 23 April 2011, against Alianza Atletico in the ninth round of the 2011 Descentralizado season, at the age of 16. His debut match was played at home in the Monumental and finished 1–0 in favor of Universitario de Deportes. Polo played from the start and was later substituted for Raúl Ruidíaz in the 67th minute. In his second professional match, Polo scored his first senior career goal on 6 May 2011 in a league match at home against Cienciano del Cuzco. He scored his first goal in the 8th minute of the match by controlling with his head a lobbed through ball from Pablo Vitti and finishing with a strong left-footed shot into the top-right corner of the net. In a very short time, Polo earned a spot in the starting eleven and played in the following league games. In round 15, Andy was on the scoresheet again in the 3–0 home win over Unión Comercio. Then he made his Torneo Intermedio (now known as the Copa Inca) debut on 28 May 2011 in the First Round against Sport Ancash. With Universitario starting the match with mainly players from the reserves and already behind two goals, Polo entered the match in the 46th minute but could not help his side avoid the 3–2 elimination away to the Rosas Pampa Stadium in Huaraz.

With the league in the mid season rest, Polo, aged 16 years, was selected by manager Javier Chirinos for the under-20 Universitario squad to participate in the first edition of the 2011 U-20 Copa Libertadores.
Andy managed to score three goals in six games and finished as the team's top scorer.
Polo went on to help his side win the very first U-20 Copa Libertadores alongside notable players such as Edison Flores and Willyan Mimbela. Chirinos included Polo in the starting eleven in all of the games including the final against Boca Juniors, which his side defeated 4–2 on penalties.

Polo made his debut in a senior international competition on 1 September 2011 in the second round of the Copa Sudamericana away to Deportivo Anzoategui. He was in the starting line up and later provided the assist for teammate Johan Fano's winning goal in the 49th minute, which gave his club a 2–1 win in the first leg. After his club got through to the next round and on the day of his 17th birthday, Polo was voted man of the match after he provided an assist for Raul Ruidiaz's goal in the 1–1 draw in the first leg match away to Godoy Cruz.
In his fourth match of the tournament, Polo scored his first goal in the Copa Sudamericana in the second leg at home (Miguel Grau stadium) against Godoy Cruz. His goal came in the 85th minute by heading in a cross from Edison Flores and eventually forced the match to a penalty shootout, which Universitario won 3–2. At the end of the season, Polo was given the award for Jugador Revelación (Breakthrough Player) of the 2011 Torneo Descentralizado season.

Internazionale
On 31 January 2014, Italian giants Internazionale signed Polo on a short-term contract for an undisclosed fee.

Millonarios
Millonarios bought 50% of his playing rights in 2014 and had Polo for 3 years with the option to buy the other 50%. He scored 2 goals in 11 games before being loaned six months later to Universitario, where he won the 2016 Apertura Tournament.

Monarcas Morelia
In January 2017, Polo moved to Mexico and signed for Monarcas Morelia.

Portland Timbers
In January 2018, Polo signed on loan with Portland Timbers of Major League Soccer. Targeted Allocation Money was used to avoid the use of a designated player contract. He made his debut in the opening round of the 2018 MLS fixtures. He started the game as the Timbers lost 2–1 to LA Galaxy at the StubHub Center.

Polo's move to Portland became permanent at the end of their 2018 season, earning $150,000 guaranteed salary per year.

On 9 February 2022, Polo was suspended by MLS pending an investigation into allegations of domestic violence made by his ex-wife. The following day Portland terminated Polo's contract with the club.

Return to Universitario
After being terminated by the Timbers, Polo signed with Universitario in March 2022. The contract was paid in full by the MLS upon his termination with his Contract with the Timbers. Despite his return, there was backlash by fans of the club as well as from the Peruvian Ministry of Women and Vulnerable Populations, with the Ministry releasing a statement expressing their solidarity with Genesis Alarcon and her children and urged the club to take immediate actions in response to the events related to Andy Polo.

International career
In May 2018, he was named in Peru's squad for the 2018 World Cup in Russia.

Career statistics

International
Statistics accurate as of match played 20 January 2022.

As of match played 28 May 2016. Peru score listed first, score column indicates score after each Polo goal.

Honours

Club
Universitario de Deportes U20
U-20 Copa Libertadores: 2011

Portland Timbers
MLS is Back Tournament: 2020

References

External links

Goal.com Profile
depor.pe

1994 births
Living people
Footballers from Lima
Association football forwards
Peruvian footballers
Peru international footballers
Peru youth international footballers
Peruvian Primera División players
Categoría Primera A players
Liga MX players
Club Universitario de Deportes footballers
Club Deportivo Universidad de San Martín de Porres players
Inter Milan players
Millonarios F.C. players
Atlético Morelia players
Portland Timbers players
Portland Timbers 2 players
Peruvian expatriate footballers
Expatriate footballers in Colombia
Expatriate footballers in Italy
Expatriate footballers in Mexico
Expatriate soccer players in the United States
Peruvian expatriate sportspeople in Colombia
Peruvian expatriate sportspeople in Italy
Peruvian expatriate sportspeople in Mexico
Peruvian expatriate sportspeople in the United States
Copa América Centenario players
Major League Soccer players
2018 FIFA World Cup players
2019 Copa América players
USL Championship players